Horst David (22 November 1938 – 8 November 2020) was a German serial killer.

Life 
David was born in Breslau. After completing a painter's apprenticeship as a hired painter, he moved to the Hainsacker district near Regensburg. In 1963, he married. He and his wife had two sons.

He stayed away from his home for days at a time, instead spending time in Munich and Hamburg (most likely in other cities too), where he spent much of his money on women, leading to financial difficulties. On 22 August 1975, during one of these trips to Munich, he murdered Waltraud Frank and, two days later, Fatima Grossart. The two prostitutes were strangled and their homes searched. Later, David stated that he quarreled with both victims because they had demanded more money than what was agreed to.

After being fired from his job and divorcing his wife, he moved to Regensburg in 1984 and lived on welfare.

Eighteen years after the Munich murders, on 7 September 1993, David's neighbour, Mathilde Steindl, was strangled in her apartment. The police, who included David as the main suspect in the preliminary investigation, arrested him after his fingerprints were found in the deceased's apartment. There was no conviction, however, because David was apparently temporarily residing in a neighbour's apartment.

His fingerprints were routinely sent to the Bavarian State Office of Criminal Investigation by the authorities. In 1994, the then-new Automated Fingerprint Identification System (AFIS) made a match with the fingerprints on Fatima Grossart's body.

In the following police investigations, David initially denied being in Munich in August 1975 and visiting any prostitutes. When he was confronted with evidence, he admitted to the murders of the two prostitutes, in addition to several others. As well as his neighbour, he also confessed to the following:

 Barbara Ernst, 59, on 12 April 1981
 Martha Lorenz, 67, on 26 January 1983
 Maria Bergmann, 70, on 27 October 1984
 Kunigunda Thoss, 84, on 22 January 1992

The three victims from 1981 to 1984 wanted to hire him as an assistant for the renovation of their homes, but refused to lend him money or pay for the services. Thoss let him borrow 20,000 Deutsche Marks over time. The three murders weren't initially recognised as murders until the confession of Horst David, who arranged them to look like household accidents.

David confessed to seven murders. According to the then investigator Josef Wilfling, financial gain also played a role in the murders. It is believed that David committed more murders. Among other things, his unusually high age at the time of his first proven murder, and his day long jogs also contribute to this. Josef Wilfling said that the brief period between the first two murders, the circumstances, and his behaviour would suggest that David already had experience in that area.

David was sentenced to life imprisonment by the Regional Court of Munich in December 1995. To his death he resided in Straubing Prison.

Crime story 
The investigation of Fatima Grossart's murder is regarded as a milestone in German crime history, as it was here for the first time that a 20-year-old crime was resolved with the help of the computer-assisted tracking system of AFIS.

Literature 

 Rudolf Schröck: Der Biedermann. Die Geschichte des Frauenmörders Horst David. Knaur, München 2004, .

Film 

 Der Mann, dem die Frauen vertrauten – Der Serienmörder Horst David. Regie: Walter Harrich (ARD, 2008), with Ulrich Tukur and others (documentary with scenes and interviews)

External links

See also
 List of German serial killers

References 

1938 births
1981 murders in Germany
1992 murders in Germany
1983 murders in Germany
1984 murders in Germany
2020 deaths
20th-century German criminals
Criminals from Bavaria
German people convicted of murder
German serial killers
Male serial killers
People convicted of murder by Germany
People from Wrocław
Serial killers who died in prison custody